The Mt. Prospect School for Boys was a historic school at 90 Worcester Lane in Waltham, Massachusetts.  It was a large Georgian Revival brick building built in 1923 to house an experimental boys' school.  The school was founded by Arthur Astor Carey (of the noted New York City Astor family), and was headed by Hugo B. Seikel.  The school only operated for about ten years, after which the property was converted for use as a nursing home.

The school complex was listed on the National Register of Historic Places in 1990.  Sometime thereafter it was demolished.

See also
National Register of Historic Places listings in Waltham, Massachusetts

References

School buildings on the National Register of Historic Places in Massachusetts
Colonial Revival architecture in Massachusetts
School buildings completed in 1923
Demolished buildings and structures in Massachusetts
National Register of Historic Places in Waltham, Massachusetts
1923 establishments in Massachusetts